"Softly" is the debut single of J-pop singer, Leah Dizon. It was released on February 14, 2007, the same day she released her second photobook Hello! Leah. The single fared moderately on the Oricon Charts, yet was quite a success for a debut single and has sold 48,554 copies to date.

Normal edition track listing
 Softly
 Everything Anything
 Without your Love

Limited edition track listing
 Softly
 Everything Anything
 Fever (Kylie Minogue cover song)

DVD track listing
 Softly (music video)
 Everything Anything (music video)

Live performances
February 24, 2007 – Music Fighter – "Softly"
February 26, 2007 – Hey! Hey! Hey! Music Champ – "Softly"

Charts
Oricon Sales Chart (Japan)

Leah Dizon songs
2007 singles
2007 songs
Victor Entertainment singles